Angel Acevedo (born July 26, 1982) is an American filmmaker.

Biography
Acevedo attended Hofstra University, where he earned a bachelor's degree in film studies and production and won Best Screenplay for his thesis film Cheesecake. While at Hofstra, he met Brian Amyot and Steven Tsapelas, and in 2004 they formed Ragtag Productions.

Acevedo is one of the driving forces behind We Need Girlfriends series, filming most of the scenes and the character of Rod is  loosely based on him.

References

External links

The official Ragtag Production website
The official We Need Girlfriends website

1982 births
Living people
Hofstra University alumni
Artists from Chicago
American filmmakers